An arene or aromatic hydrocarbon is a hydrocarbon with alternating double and single bonds between carbon atoms forming rings. Benzene is an example of an arene. 

Arene may also refer to:

 Arene (gastropod), a genus of marine snails in the family Areneidae
 Arene (mythology), the wife of Aphareus and mother of Idas and Lynceus in Greek mythology
 Arene, Elis, an ancient town in Elis, Greece, also known as Samiko
 Jean Arènes (1898–1960), French botanist who described many new species of the genus Dombeya
 Paul Arène (1843–1896), Provençal poet and French writer
 Arene (Arknights), 4 star guard operator from hit mobile tower defense RPG Arknights

See also
 Arena (disambiguation)